Tweedside Mill in Peebles was originally a corn mill, rebuilt as Peebles' first modern woollen manufacturing mill in 1856 by Thomas Dickson.  It was situated on the River Tweed to the west of the Tweed Bridge and below the parish church on Castle Hill.

In 1858 the mill was bought by Laing & Irvine who, in 1860, installed mechanical looms powered by a 15 ft diameter water wheel, at a cost of four thousand pounds. Laing & Irvine failed to run the mill economically and in 1875 it had been bought over by Walter Thorburn & Bros, a partnership set up by Michael and Walter Thorburn, sons of Walter Thorburn, a former Provost of the town. Thorburn's proceeded to establish Damdale Mill built in 1869, and they would go on to build a large warehouse by the station.  
In the late 1870s Andrew Robb (1825-1900), the Manager of Gaberston Mill in Alloa, was brought in to manage the mill for the Thorburns.  In 1881 he was sharing a house with Frederick Morris, another Thorburn Mill Manager.  The Thorburns retained the mill until it was demolished after a serious fire on 12 February 1965. At the time of closing it employed around 70 people.  The site remained empty until the 1980s when it was replaced by a swimming pool and leisure centre designed by Architects, Morris & Steadman in 1982/3.

References

Woollen mills